Scio High School is a public high school in Scio, Oregon. As one of eight public high schools located in Linn County, the school serves a large portion of the county's northwestern corner. The district spans the greater Scio area, reaching the community of Jordan, Oregon and northern parts of Lacomb, Oregon.

Academics
In 2017, 95% of the school's seniors received their high school diploma. State testing reported that 65% of students were at or above the reading proficiency level compared to only 35% of students who did the same with math. Most graduating students of Scio, who pursue further education, attend Linn-Benton Community College in Albany, OR.

Athletics
Over the 2009 and 2010 seasons, Scio's football team recorded a 28–0 record and won 2 state championships. Thereafter, the football program continues to succeed with the overwhelming support of the community. Scio High School Alumni Bernard A. Newcomb along with the community have raised money to build a stadium and put in artificial turf in most athletic areas. Newcomb's name is placed on the outside of the stadium while the hundreds of community contributors names are placed on the inside.

State championships
 Baseball: 1989
 Boys' Basketball: 1981
 Girls' Basketball: 1976
 Football: 2009, 2010 
 Team Wrestling: 1982

Student Profile
For the 2015–2016 academic year, Scio high's student population was 87% White, 7% Hispanic, 2% American Indian, and 4% Mixed race.

Notable alumni
Bernard A. Newcomb - American Businessperson, founder of E-Trade

Doug Mikolas - former NFL player and super bowl champion with the San Francisco 49ers. Doug also played for the Houston Oilers

References

High schools in Linn County, Oregon
Public high schools in Oregon